Bussea gossweileri is a species of legume in the family Fabaceae in the genus Bussea. It is found in Angola and Zaire.

References

Caesalpinioideae